Clifton High School is a co-educational private school in Clifton, Bristol, England. The school is the only one in the region to operate the Diamond Edge model of education. This model means boys and girls are educated together from Nursery to Year 6, then separately in some subjects between Years 7 and 9. In Years 7 to 9 boys and girls are taught separately for English, Mathematics, Biology, Chemistry, Physics and Games. They are then taught together in all subjects from Years 10 to 13. Clifton High School was founded as an all-girls' school in 1877 for girls aged 7–17, and the nearby Clifton College was then a boys' school. In 1887, a preparatory class was set-up where boys were soon admitted. It became fully coeducational in 2009. It is a member of the Society of Heads.

History 

Clifton High School for Girls was founded in January 1877 (after some opposition from nearby Bristol Grammar School) by visionaries including John Percival (bishop), the first Headmaster of Clifton College. In 1876, LT-Col. Pears discussed the possibility of founding a day school for girls in Clifton with Dr Percival, Mr Wollaston and others interested in starting an education. Dr Percival asked some of the most prominent Bristol Men, including George Alfred Wills. The first council was started on 12 September 1877. The school officially opened its doors on 1 January 1878 with 67 students. The first student at the school was Bessie Percival, a relative to the founder John Percival (bishop). The first head was Ms Mary Alice Woods who was head in 1877–1891. In 1887, a preparatory class was set up where boys were soon admitted. Boys first joined the Junior School in 1994, and the Sixth Form began accepting boys in 2008 and the school became fully coeducational the following year. Clifton High originally opened its doors in 1878 at 65 Pembroke Road. Around this time Clifton was at the height of its expansion with the Victoria Rooms, RWA, Christchurch and Whiteladies Road all recently constructed. Within a year of opening, the school needed to expand and as such moved into a large house that had been built in 1876, on College Road. The house is now part of the school's main building.

In the sixty years following its move significant expansion took place, the original hall was built in 1889 and a new wing added to the original house in 1927 by Sir George Oatley. The wing was funded by a performance performed by students entitled 'Chaucer's England' in 1926. In the mid–1930s the tunnel under the road and gymnasium were constructed. During this time the school also expanded into the houses on School Green and into properties on Clifton Park. By 1951, the school site was largely as it is today.

During the summer break of 2022, Clifton High School revamped some of its facilities and began construction of a new building for the Sixth Form. The same year, it was announced the school would be rebranding.

The logo and possibly the uniform would be changed, and the school colours would be condensed into two colours—green and red. The changes are planned to be implemented in September 2023. On 1 December 2022, the first edition of the school newspaper was published. Mr. Bennett, introduced the tradition of teacher's singing and dancing to Christmas songs via video, the first of which was made in 2020.

The Rose Day

Clifton High School holds its annual Rose Day at the end of the school year in early July. It is held at the Bristol Cathedral, and is held to commomorate the school's history and is a celebration of its achievements.

One of the school's oldest traditions, Rose Day was established by Clifton High's first head teacher, Miss Woods, in the 1880s. The Rose was officially chosen by Ms Woods in 1891. In 1945, Rose day was moved from the nearby Clifton Cathedral to Bristol Cathedral.

Houses 

In the 1950s and 1960s the houses were named after the school's founders and early benefactors, Budgett, Percival, Pope, Pears, Winkworth and Wollaston. Later they were named after famous women: Austen (pink); Curie (yellow); and Odette (green). The house names were then changed in academic year 2009–2010 to Holmes, Radcliffe and Redgrave; as this was the first year allowing boys throughout the entire school. The house names were changed back in academic year 2010–2011, following a competition, to the names of the school founders, Wollaston (yellow), Winkworth (red), Pears (blue) and Percival (green).

Facilities 

School facilities include a sports centre, swimming pool (opened in 1967), multimedia language centre, cooking room and several information technology rooms. The Great Hall was opened in 1889 and boarding facilities were made in 1896 until the 1990s. The Rose Theatre was opened in 1967 along with the music and art department buildings, which then housed the sewing house and junior boarding house.

The school owns the Coombe Dingle Sports Centre, in partnership with the University of Bristol, which has facilities including lacrosse, rugby and football pitches, and indoor and outdoor tennis courts. In 2022, Clifton High revamped a large number of facilities, including the dining hall and Arts department, as well as starting the construction of a new Sixth Form Centre. A school orchestra was made in 1893.

Heads of School

Top left – Ms Woods
Top Right – Ms Burns
Bottom Left – Ms Phillips
Bottom Right – Ms Glenday

The Heads of Clifton High School, in list by chronological order:
(1877–1891) Ms Mary Alice Woods
(1891–1908) Ms Catherine Burns
(1908–1933) Ms Eleanor Addison Phillips
(1933–1962) Ms Nonita Glenday
(1962–1964) Ms S.L. McKillop
(1965–1985) Ms Pamela Stringer
(1985–1996) Ms Joyce Walters
(1996–1998) Mrs Yvonne Graham
(1998–2008) Ms Colette Cullingam
(2008–2020) Dr Alison Neill
(2020–present) Mr Matthew Bennett

Notable former pupils

Clifton High School Alumni are known as 'Clifton Rosarians' in-school. Rosarians also get to view 'The Rosarian' a magazine featuring the latest information on the school.
 Violet Alford, dancer
 Caroline Bammel, religious historian
 Jo Durie, professional tennis player
 Catharine Edwards, ancient historian and academic
 Ruth Edwards, conservative MP
 Elizabeth Filkin, British public functionary
 Elinor Goldschmied, English educationalist
 Margaret Irwin, novelist
Glynis Johns, actress
 Melanie Johnson, labour politician
 Mary Lobel, historian
 Dame Eileen Mayo, artist and designer
 Mary Renault, writer
 Jane Shepherdson, businesswoman
 Hilary Spurling, writer
Kate Shortman, artistic swimmer
Isabelle Thorpe, artistic swimmer
Helen Vanderplank, biologist
Mona Wilson, British author and public servant

Archives
Much of the schools information is found at the schools Archives and the schools history books. The school archives can only be accessed by teachers and students with special requests, such as writing about school history.

References

External links 
 

Private schools in Bristol
Clifton, Bristol
Diamond schools